Glendale is the name of a valley in North Northumberland that runs from the Cheviot Hills at Kirknewton onto the Milfield Plain, formed by the River Glen. However, the name is generally taken to indicate the area around the town of Wooler.

Glendale gave rise to the fictional "Greendale", the area in which the Postman Pat stories are set. Author John Cunliffe adapted the name in his series of children's books after working in the area as a mobile library driver for many years. Many of the place names in Postman Pat can be linked back to names of places both in this area, and Longsleddale near Kendal, Cumbria, where he also lived.

Environment of Northumberland